Anke Scholz (born 25 November 1978 in Berlin) is a retired female swimmer from Germany, specialised in the freestyle and backstroke events. She was a member of the German women's relay team that won the silver medal in the 4 × 200m freestyle event at the 1996 Summer Olympics in Atlanta, Georgia.

References 
 sports-reference

1978 births
Living people
Swimmers from Berlin
German female swimmers
German female backstroke swimmers
Olympic swimmers of Germany
Swimmers at the 1996 Summer Olympics
Olympic silver medalists for Germany
German female freestyle swimmers
Medalists at the 1996 Summer Olympics
Olympic silver medalists in swimming
20th-century German women
21st-century German women